Windsor House may refer to:

 Windsor House (Belfast) – a high-rise building built in 1974
 Windsor House (Hong Kong) – a high-rise building built in 1979
 Windsor House, London – an office building built in 1973

It may also refer to:

 House of Windsor – the British royal family
 Joseph Windsor House at Iron County MRA in Michigan, United States